Rodrick Clark Boler (February 26, 1942 – November 29, 2013) was an American football and baseball coach. He served as the head football coach at the Bloomsburg University of Pennsylvania from 1980 to 1981, compiling a record of 1–18. Boler played college football at the University of Alabama under coach Bear Bryant.

References

External links
 

1942 births
2013 deaths
American football tackles
Alabama Crimson Tide football players
Alabama Crimson Tide football coaches
Bloomsburg Huskies baseball coaches
Bloomsburg Huskies football coaches
People from Northport, Alabama
Players of American football from Alabama